Jean-Baptiste van Silfhout (4 February 1902 – 1956) was a Dutch sportsman. He competed in swimming (100 metre freestyle) and water polo at the 1920 Summer Olympics, rowing (coxed four) at the 1924 Summer Olympics, and water polo at the 1928 Summer Olympics.

References

External links
 

1902 births
1956 deaths
Dutch male rowers
Dutch male freestyle swimmers
Dutch male water polo players
Olympic rowers of the Netherlands
Olympic swimmers of the Netherlands
Olympic water polo players of the Netherlands
Swimmers at the 1920 Summer Olympics
Water polo players at the 1920 Summer Olympics
Rowers at the 1924 Summer Olympics
Water polo players at the 1928 Summer Olympics
Rowers from Amsterdam
Sportspeople from Amsterdam
European Rowing Championships medalists
20th-century Dutch people